Under My Skin is the fifth and final studio album by Swedish girlband Play, released on 21 April 2010. The first single off the album was "Famous". It debuted at #7 on the Swedish Albums Chart - their first entry on the chart. This was also the group's last album, as less than half a year after Faye left a second time the group also disbanded for a second time.

Background and promotion
The Play band members had not seen each other for several years, until one day when Anaïs Lameche managed to get a hold of Fanny Hamlin ("Faye") via phone. The two of them talked over lunch about reuniting Play, and decided that it was time for Play to return. After the launch of Made in Sweden season two, Laila, one of the band's former managers, also wanted to reunite the girls as a band. Fanny and Anais returned for the reunion; Rosie Munter dropped out in the last minute, and Anna Sundstrand did not join the reunion due to living in the United States.  With only two remaining girls, they began the search for a third member. After about a week, Sanne Karlsson, who was previously a member of the band Ghost vs Sanne, joined the group after recording a demo song for Play.

Season two of the TV program Made in Sweden showcased the hard work all three girls put into making their new album and promoting Play, also including the search for the third member Sanne. Their new album was recorded in four weeks, and after that, Play performed their new songs live at several locations, such as Elgiganten stores and television shows in Sweden. They also made other appearances, and took other media trips like radio, magazines, and interviews.

Track listing

Personnel
Play
Faye Hamlin – lead vocals
Anaïs Lameche – lead vocals
Sanne Karlsson – lead vocals

Crew
Andreas Carlsson - songwriting (1, 6, 8, 10)
Desmond Child - songwriting (1, 6, 10)
Steven Sater - songwriting (6)
Anders Bagge - songwriting (8)
Peer Åström - songwriting (8)
Vanilla Black - songwriting (8)
Alex Lamb - remix (11)
Andreas Gyllström - remix (12)

Charts

References

2010 albums
Play (Swedish group) albums
Pop rock albums by Swedish artists